The Catholic Church in Zimbabwe (in southern Africa; formerly (Southern) Rhodesia) is composed only of a Latin hierarchy, joint in the national Episcopal Conference of Zimbabwe, comprising two ecclesiastical provinces, each headed by a Metropolitan with three suffragan dioceses each.

There are no Eastern Catholic, pre-diocesan or other exempt jurisdictions.

All defunct jurisdictions have current Latin successor sees.

There is an Apostolic Nunciature to Zimbabwe as papal diplomatic representation (embassy-level) in the national capital Harare (formerly Salisbury, Rhodesia)).

Current Latin sees

Ecclesiastical Province of Bulawayo 
 Metropolitan Archdiocese of Bulawayo
 Roman Catholic Diocese of Gweru
 Roman Catholic Diocese of Hwange
 Roman Catholic Diocese of Masvingo

Ecclesiastical Province of Harare 
 Metropolitan Archdiocese of Harare
 Roman Catholic Diocese of Chinhoyi
 Roman Catholic Diocese of Gokwe
 Roman Catholic Diocese of Mutare

See also 
 Catholic Church in Zimbabwe
 List of Catholic dioceses (structured view)

References

External links 
 GCatholic - data for all sections

Zimbabwe

Catholic dioceses